My Life 4Hunnid is the fifth studio album by American rapper YG, released on October 2, 2020, by 4Hunnid Records and Def Jam Recordings. The album features guest appearances from D3szn, Lil Wayne, Chris Brown, Tyga, Lil Tjay, Tay2xs, Gunna, Ty Dolla Sign, Calboy, and Lil Mosey.

Background
The title is a reference to YG's record label,  4Hunnid Records. American singer Ty Dolla Sign and American record producer Mustard, who are two of YG's closest friends, also run the label. Nobody has signed to it yet, as it was recently launched.

On the album's cover art, YG is wearing a red shirt with the album's title written all over it and a red light is shining on his body. This is due to the fact that the rapper is closely associated with the Bloods street gang, in which they wear the color red.

Singles 
YG released the album's lead single, "Laugh Now Kry Later!", on May 1, 2020, alongside the official music video. The album's original title was supposed to be the same name as the single. The second single, "FTP", which stands for "Fuck the Police", a protest single supporting the protests related to the Black Lives Matter movement, was released on June 2, 2020, in coincidence with Blackout Tuesday.

Commercial performance 
In the United States, My Life 4Hunnid debuted at number four on the US Billboard 200 with 64,000 album-equivalent units, which included 40,000 pure album sales (a majority of which were paired with bundles from his 4 Hunnid clothing line).

Track listing 
Credits adapted from Tidal.

Notes
  signifies a co-producer
"Swag" is stylized in all caps

Charts

References 

2020 albums
YG (rapper) albums
Def Jam Recordings albums